Hend may refer to
Hend (name)
Louis Forniquet Henderson (1853–1942), American botanist referred to as L.F.Hend.
Hend Khaleh Rural District in Iran
Hend Khaleh, a village in Iran
Fariz Hend, a village in Iran
Bid Hend, Isfahan, a village in Iran